Heritiana Thierry Ratsimbazafy (born 21 September 1986) is a Malagasy former footballer who played as a midfielder.

Career

Ratsimbazafy started his career with Malagasy side Academie Ny Antsika, helping them win the league, their only major trophy. Before the 2009 season, he signed for JS Gauloise in Reunion. Before the 2015 season, Ratsimbazafy signed for Thai second tier club Samut Songkhram. Before the 2016 season, he signed for Nonthaburi in the Thai third tier.

References

External links

 

1986 births
Academie Ny Antsika players
Association football midfielders
Expatriate footballers in Réunion
Expatriate footballers in Thailand
Living people
Madagascar international footballers
Malagasy expatriate footballers
Malagasy expatriate sportspeople in Réunion 
Malagasy expatriate sportspeople in Thailand
Malagasy footballers
Malagasy Pro League players
Nonthaburi United S.Boonmeerit F.C. players
Samutsongkhram F.C. players
Thierry Ratsimbazafy
Thierry Ratsimbazafy
Thierry Ratsimbazafy